Blind Vaysha (French: Vaysha l'aveugle) is a 2016 animated short by Theodore Ushev, produced by Marc Bertrand for the National Film Board of Canada, with the participation of ARTE France. Based on a story by Georgi Gospodinov, the film tells the story of a girl who sees the past out of her left eye and the future from her right—and so is unable to live in the present. Montreal actress Caroline Dhavernas performed the narration for the film, in both its French and English language versions. The film incorporates music from Bulgarian musician and composer Kottarashky and is his and Ushev's fourth collaboration.

Development
Ushev has stated that the project began at Fontevraud Abbey in France, where he worked for a month on the story and was inspired by medieval drawing. He did fifty paintings during his stay in Maine-et-Loire, drawing inspiration from the Abbey's architecture and with the design of the film's central character influenced by paintings of Eleanor of Aquitaine.

Ushev was already working with a text by Gospodinov for an upcoming film when he and a group of friends had the idea of making "an omnibus out of some of his short stories." While reading them, Ushev was captivated by the story of Blind Vaysha, which immediately struck him as being suited to his style of filmmaking.

Production
The film is animated on a Cintiq tablet in a linocut-style, a medium Ushev had worked with since the age of 12. Ushev sought to reproduce the visual artifacts of the linocut technique by never using the "Undo" command on his computer while drawing: "Because with linocut, once your hand carves it, it is gone. You cannot put the black back. This creates a natural feeling of the unpredictable, of mistakes and the holy imperfection of the image—which is the basis of every creation." Ushev has estimated he did between 12,000 and 13,000 drawings for the film, which took him about six months to make. As with two of Ushev's earlier films, Drux Flux and Gloria Victoria, Blind Vaysha was produced as a 3D film.

Reception
Blind Vaysha had its world premiere at the 2016 Berlinale. It received both the Jury Award and Junior Jury Award at the 2016 Annecy International Animated Film Festival. In September 2016, the film received the Cartoon Network Award for Best Narrative Short Animation and the Canadian Film Institute Award for Best Canadian Animation at the Ottawa International Animation Festival. The film was also included in the list of Canada's Top Ten shorts of 2016, selected by a panel of filmmakers and industry professionals organized by TIFF.

In March 2017, Blind Vaysha won the Canadian Screen Award for Best Animated Short at the 5th Canadian Screen Awards, and in June it won the Prix Iris for Best Animated Short Film at the 19th Quebec Cinema Awards.

It was also nominated for Best Animated Short at the 89th Academy Awards (lost to Pixar's Piper). Ushev stated that with 16 films to his credit to date, he had given up hope of ever being nominated for an Oscar because he worried that his films might be "too abstract, too avant garde, too elitist, too dark" for the Academy. He stated that upon hearing the news of his Oscar nomination, he had a strong emotional reaction: "When I heard the name of my film, I just stopped watching, because I fainted... I cried. At first I laughed and then I cried again. It's out of control.... It's all strange and exciting." On February 26, upon the eve of the Oscars, public television in Ushev's native Bulgaria aired a dubbed version of the film, narrated by Teodora Duhovnikova.

Virtual reality
The 8-minute animated short will reportedly be adapted next into a virtual reality work by the NFB.

References

External links

Blind Vaysha at the National Film Board of Canada
Trailer on Vimeo

2016 animated films
2016 films
Canadian 3D films
2016 3D films
Films directed by Theodore Ushev
National Film Board of Canada animated short films
Films based on short fiction
Computer-animated short films
Best Animated Short Film Genie and Canadian Screen Award winners
2016 short films
Canadian animated short films
3D animated short films
2010s Canadian films
Best Animated Short Film Jutra and Iris Award winners